The John D. Spreckels Building is a  building in San Diego. Completed in 1924, it was the tallest building in San Diego until the El Cortez Hotel was built three years later. The building was designed by Los Angeles-area architects John and Donald Parkinson and features architectural terra cotta produced by Gladding, McBean.

References

Emporis
Skyscraper Page

Skyscrapers in San Diego
Skyscrapers in California

Buildings and structures completed in 1924